Zefiro is a family of high-speed passenger trains designed by Bombardier Transportation (now Alstom) whose variants have top operating speeds of between ;  and .

Background

Bombardier Transportation and its predecessor companies produced a variety of high-speed trainsets, as part collaborations with other conglomerates, such as the Intercity-Express family of locomotives (Germany), AVE Class 102, RENFE class 130 (Spain), ICN (Switzerland), the Acela express (USA), and parts of the TGV Duplex, Eurostar, Thalys, and ETR 500 trainsets (Europe various).

Additionally the company has independently produced high-speed trainsets for specific markets, such as CRH1, "Xinshisu" (China), X 2000, Regina (Sweden) and Class 71 (Norway).

In November 2005 Bombardier launched its general solution, the Zefiro single-deck train for high-speed rail lines, available in 4-, 8-,12- or 16-car sets, capable of being configured for a variety of supply voltages, and produced in either standard or a wide widths.

In December 2021 Alstom announced plans to transfer the intellectual property and business activities associated with the Zefiro V300 to Hitachi Rail. This was a condition of Alstom's acquisition of Bombardier put in place by the European Commission in order to remain compliant with EU competition law. The transaction was completed on 1 July 2022.

Design 
The Zefiro trainset is a conventional (non-inter-coach articulated) single-deck electrical-multiple-unit high-speed train. It consists of powered and unpowered cars, with motorized power cars at either end. Car bodies are constructed of aluminium, with the exception of the wide-bodied Zefiro 250 trains, which have stainless steel bodies. They have customisable open-plan layouts.

Trains are made up of 4-car units, each of which contains a transformer and its own power supply. Typically, the end cars of each 4-car unit have powered bogies, with the two middle cars being unpowered. The pantograph is located on one of the unpowered cars.

The specifications for all current designs (2009) describe asynchronous three-phase motors, with forced air cooling. However, Bombardier also offers the option of permanent-magnet synchronous motors (which it groups in its "ECO4" energy-saving technologies), which were tested on modified Regina trains in 2008 on the "Green Train".

Variants

Zefiro 250

The first variant of the Zefiro concept to be produced was a series of twenty 16-car EMU sleeper trains produced by Bombardier's joint venture Sifang Power (Qingdao) Transportation (BSP), which were delivered from 2009. These trains were the first high-speed train licensed to be manufactured in China as well as the fastest sleeper trains in the world. China Railways designated them as CRH1E.

In July 2010, the Ministry of Railways ordered 40 more 8-car  CRH1E Zefiro high-speed trains from the Sifang (Qingdao) Transportation Ltd joint venture.

In September 2012, based on a modified contract with Bombardier, the MOR ordered an additional 106 8-car trains, 60 of which are to be a new variant, designated the Zefiro 250NG. This variant is an evolution of the original, and will utilize different materials in order to provide weight savings and more efficient operation.

In 2018, the Swedish regional transport agency Västtrafik ordered 45 Bombardier Zefiro for delivery in 2021. See also the Zefiro Express section below.

In 2021, the Swedish train operator SJ decided to buy 25 new Bombardier Zefiro, expected to come into service in 2026.

Zefiro 300

The Zefiro 300 is intended for European operations, with a UIC profile, and capable of being fitted for use on all four European electrification schemes (1.5 & 3 kV DC, 15 & 25  kV AC). Bogies are FLEXX type with a  wheelbase, 50% of which are motorized.
Two 8-car sets can be joined together to form one longer train.

A variant of the Zefiro 300 was offered by Bombardier in association with AnsaldoBreda to Trenitalia, the Italian national railway service, as part of a bid for 50 new high-speed trainsets in 2010. Trenitalia selected this bid as the winner on 5 August 2010. These entered service in 2015 and are designated ETR1000 - Frecciarossa 1000.

An evolution of the Zefiro 300 platform was also offered by a joint venture between Bombardier (later Alstom) and Hitachi Rail for the HS2 rolling stock tender for its first phase, for which it was awarded the contract for 54 trainsets.

Zefiro 380

In September 2009, Bombardier announced an order for eighty Zefiro 380 high-speed trains by the Chinese Ministry of Railways (MOR) to be produced at Bombardier's joint venture Sifang (Qingdao) Transportation Ltd. The order of twenty 8-car sets and sixty 16-car sets was estimated to be worth 27.4 billion RMB (approx €2.7 billion or $4 billion). The value of Bombardier's share is estimated at €1.3 billion.

Under China Railways' use these trains have been designated CRH1C (8-car set) and CRH1D (16-car set). which was in December 2010 revised to CRH380C and CRH380CL and once again to CRH380D (8-car set) & CRH380DL (16-car set) according to the new numbering system.

As of September 2012, the order has been amended to include only seventy 8-car sets, designated as the CRH380D. Orders for the 16-car DL sets were converted to D sets in late 2011.

All the 85 trainsets have been delivered and are currently operated by Shanghai Railway Bureau & Chengdu Railway Bureau.

Zefiro Express 
First delivery was planned at end of 2021, but the coronavirus pandemic has delayed the production and test runs of the new trains. Västtrafik now expects that the first train set will arrive in Västerås in April 2022, and that another four train sets will be delivered to Sweden during the spring. The first vehicles are expected to be operating in the traffic in spring 2024
The trains are designed for the colder weather conditions under which the fleet will operate, including temperatures as low as -40 degrees Celsius and snow drifts up to 80cm deep. They are equipped with a winter package including an uprated propulsion system, a single-axle drive and enhanced slip-slide regulation. The bodyshells were manufactured by Bombardier Sifang (Qingdao) Transportation Ltd in China with final fit-out of all other components performed at the Hennigsdorf works in Germany. The trains have been thoroughly temperature tested already, and will be tested further in Sweden winter 2022.

See also
 China Railway CRH1- Class designation of China railways high-speed trains of Bombardier design
 Siemens Velaro -competitor of similar design.
 Alstom AGV -competitor of similar design.
 Alstom New Pendolino - competitor of similar design
 List of high-speed trains

References

External links
 Bombardier Zefiro Bombardier Zefiro site

Bombardier Transportation multiple units
High-speed trains of China
High-speed trains
AnsaldoBreda multiple units
3000 V DC multiple units
15 kV AC multiple units
25 kV AC multiple units
Passenger trains running at least at 250 km/h in commercial operations
1500 V DC multiple units of France